The women's shot put event at the 1995 Summer Universiade was held on 1–2 September at the Hakatanomori Athletic Stadium in Fukuoka, Japan.

Medalists

Results

Qualification
Qualification: 15.00 m (Q) or at least 12 best (q) qualified for the final.

Final

References

Athletics at the 1995 Summer Universiade
1995 in women's athletics
1995